Viking ships were marine vessels of unique structure, used in Scandinavia from the Viking Age throughout the Middle Ages.
The boat-types were quite varied, depending on what the ship was intended for, but they were generally characterized as being slender and flexible boats, with symmetrical ends with true keel. They were clinker built, which is the overlapping of planks riveted together. Some might have had a dragon's head or other circular object protruding from the bow and stern for design, although this is only inferred from historical sources. Viking ships were used both for military purposes and for long-distance trade, exploration and colonization.

In the literature, Viking ships are usually seen divided into two broad categories: merchant ships and warships, the latter resembling narrow "war canoes" with less load capacity, but higher speed. However, these categories are overlapping; some transport ships would also form part of war fleets. As a rule, ship lanes in Scandinavia followed coastal waters, hence a majority of vessels were of a lighter design, while a few types, such as the knarr, could navigate the open ocean. The Viking ships ranged from the Baltic Sea to far from the Scandinavian homelands, to Iceland, the Faroe Islands, Greenland, Newfoundland, the Mediterranean, the Black Sea and Africa.

One particular advantage of the Viking ship is the comparatively low weight, making land transport and portage routine, as in crossing Jutland instead of rounding Skagen to enter or exit the Baltic Sea, and travel on the river networks of Eastern Europe.

Development 
The ship has been functioning as the centerpiece of Scandinavian culture for millennia, serving both pragmatic and religious purposes, and its importance was already deeply rooted in the Scandinavian culture when the Viking Age began. Scandinavia is a region with relatively high inland mountain ranges, dense forests and easy access to the sea with many natural ports. Consequently, trade routes were primarily operated via shipping, as inland travel was both more hazardous and cumbersome. Many stone engravings from the Nordic Stone Age and in particular the Nordic Bronze Age, depict ships in various situations and valuable ships were sacrificed as part of  ceremonial votive offerings since at least the Nordic Iron Age, as evidenced by the Hjortspring and Nydam boats.

The Viking Age saw the first local developments of trading ports into forts and coastal towns, all of which were deeply dependent on the North Sea and the Baltic Sea for survival and growth. Control of the waterways was of great economical and political importance, and consequently, ships were in high demand. Because of their overwhelming importance, ships became a mainstay of the Viking religion, as they evolved into symbols of power and prowess. The Hedeby coins, among the earliest known Danish currency, have impressions of ships as emblems, showing the importance of naval vessels in the area.  Through such cultural and practical significance, the Viking ship progressed into the most powerful, advanced naval vessel in Viking Age Europe.

Faering 

A faering is an open rowboat with two pairs of oars, commonly found in most boatbuilding traditions in Western and Northern Scandinavia, dating back to the Viking Age. Forerunners of the færing boat type were found both in the Gokstad and the Tune ship burials. As with the Viking ships, such auxiliary vessels are built so light that the full complement of rowers is sufficient to transport the boat over land.

Knarr 

Knarr is the Norse term for ships that were built for cargo transport. Overall displacement: 50 tons. This is shorter than the Gokstad type of longships, but knarrs are sturdier by design and they depended mostly on sail-power, only putting oars to use as auxiliaries if there was no wind on the open water. Because of this, the knarr was used for longer voyages, ocean-going transports and more hazardous trips than the Gokstad type. It was capable of sailing  in one day, and held a crew of about 20–30. Knarrs routinely crossed the North Atlantic in the Viking Age, carrying livestock and goods to and from Greenland and the North Atlantic islands. The design of the knarr later influenced the design of the cog, used in the Baltic Sea by the Hanseatic League.

Longship 

Longships were naval vessels made and used by the Vikings from Scandinavia and Iceland for trade, commerce, exploration, and warfare during the Viking Age. The longship's design evolved over many years, as seen in the Nydam and Kvalsund ships. The character and appearance of these ships have been reflected in Scandinavian boatbuilding traditions until today.

The long-ship is as a graceful, long, narrow, light, wooden boat with a shallow draft hull designed for speed. The ship's shallow draft allowed navigation in waters only one meter deep and permitted beach landings, while its light weight enabled it to be carried over portages. Longships were also double-ended, the symmetrical bow and stern allowing the ship to reverse direction quickly without having to turn around. Longships were fitted with oars along almost the entire length of the boat itself. Later versions sported a rectangular sail on a single mast which was used to replace or augment the effort of the rowers, particularly during long journeys.

Longships can be classified into a number of different types, depending on size, construction details, and prestige. The most common way to classify longships is by the number of rowing positions on board. Types ranged from the Karvi, with 13 rowing benches, to the Busse, one of which has been found with an estimated 34 rowing positions.

Longships were the epitome of Scandinavian naval power at the time and were highly valued possessions. They were owned by coastal farmers and assembled by the king to form the leidang in times of conflict, in order to have a powerful naval force at his disposal. While longships were deployed by the Norse in warfare, there are no descriptions of naval tactics such as ramming, etc. Instead, the ships would sometimes be lashed together in battle to form a steady platform for infantry warfare. Longships were called dragonships (drakuskippan) by the Franks because they had a dragon-shaped prow.

Karve 

The Karve was a small type of Viking longship, with a broad hull somewhat similar to the knarr. They were used for both war and ordinary transport, carrying people, cargo or livestock. Because they were able to navigate in very shallow water, they were also used for coasting.

Ship construction 

Viking ships varied from other contemporary ships, being generally more seaworthy and lighter. This was achieved through use of clinker (lapstrake) construction. The planks on Viking vessels were rived (split) from large, old-growth trees — especially oak.  A ship's hull could be as thin as one inch (2.5 cm), as a rived plank is stronger than a sawed plank found in later craft, resulting in a strong yet supple hull.

Working up from a stout oaken keel and ribs, the shipwrights would rivet on the planks using wrought iron rivets and roves, reinforced with added support ribs and thwarts. Each tier of planks overlapped the one below, and a caulking of tarred cow's hair was used between planks to create a waterproof hull.

Remarkably large vessels could be constructed using traditional clinker construction. Dragon-ships carrying 100 warriors were not uncommon.

Furthermore, during the early Viking Age, oar ports replaced rowlocks, allowing oars to be stored while the ship was at sail and to provide better angles for rowing. The largest ships of the era could travel five to six knots using oar power and up to ten knots under sail.

Navigation 

With such technological improvements, the Vikings began to make more and more ocean voyages, as their ships were more seaworthy. However, in order to sail in ocean waters, the Vikings needed to develop methods of relatively precise navigation. Most commonly, a ship's pilot drew on traditional knowledge to set the ship's course. Essentially, the Vikings simply used prior familiarity with tides, sailing times, and landmarks in order to route courses. For example, scholars contend that the sighting of a whale allowed the Vikings to determine the direction of a ship. Because whales feed in highly nutritious waters, commonly found in regions where landmasses have pushed deep-water currents towards shallower areas, the sighting of a whale functioned as a signal that land was near.

On the other hand, some academics have proposed that the Vikings also developed more advanced aids to navigation, such as the use of a sun compass. A wooden half-disc found on the shores of Narsarsuaq, Greenland initially seemed to support this hypothesis. However, further investigation of the object revealed that the slits inscribed in the disc are disproportionately spaced, and so the object could not in fact function as an accurate compass. Rather it has been suggested that the instrument is instead a “confession disc” used by priests to count the number of confessions in their parish. Similarly, researchers and historians continually debate the use of the sunstone in Viking navigation. Because a sunstone is able to polarize light, it is a plausible method for determining direction. By showing which direction light waves are oscillating, the sunstone has the potential to show the sun's position even when the sun is obscured by clouds. The stone changes to a certain color, based on the direction of the waves, but only when the object is held in an area with direct sunlight. Thus, most scholars debate the reliability and the plausibility of using a navigational tool that can only determine direction in such limited conditions.

Viking sagas routinely tell of voyages where Vikings suffered from being "hafvilla" (bewildered)—voyages beset by fog or bad weather, where they completely lost their sense of direction. This description suggests they did not use a sunstone when the sun was obscured. Moreover, the fact that this same bewilderment could arise when the winds died suggests that the Vikings relied on prevailing winds to navigate, as expected if their skills depended principally on traditional knowledge.

Ship burial 

Prominent men or women in Norse society sometimes received a ship burial. The body of the deceased would be prepared and dressed in fine clothes and then be transported to the burial-place in a wagon drawn by horses. The deceased would be placed on the ship, along with many prized possessions. Horses, dogs and occasionally thralls and households might also be sacrificially killed and buried with the deceased. The origin and meaning of these customs remain unknown. Several examples of Viking ship burials have been excavated, e.g. the Oseberg ship in Norway, containing the remains of two women, the Gokstad ship in Norway, and the Ladby ship in Denmark.

There are literary sources such as the Norse  Skjoldunga Saga and the Ynglinga Saga which describe more literal "ship burials" in which the deceased and goods are placed on a boat in the water and the vessel is launched into the sea, sometimes being shot with burning arrows and vanishing into the night, ablaze. Nothcotte Toller, however, states:

Burial of ships is an ancient tradition in Scandinavia, stretching back to at least the Nordic Iron Age, as evidenced by the Hjortspring boat (400–300 BC) or the Nydam boats (200–450 AD), for example. Ships and bodies of water have held major spiritual importance in the Norse cultures since at least the Nordic Bronze Age.

Preserved ships 

Several original Viking ships have been found through the ages, but only a few have been relatively intact. The most notable of these few ships include:
 Gokstad ship: overall length – approximately 
 Oseberg ship: overall length – approximately 

Examples of other Viking ships, including some that are relatively well-preserved and some where only very small parts remain:

 
 Kvalsund ship
 Ladby ship
 Myklebust Ship
 : found during the expansion of the Viking Ship Museum and the longest known Viking ship at about 

Have been regarded as Viking ships, but from before or after the Viking Age:
 Salme ships: from 700 to 750 AD, before the Viking Age
 : from 1250 to 1300 AD, after the Viking Age

Replicas 

Viking ship replicas are one of the more common types of ship replica. Viking, the very first Viking ship replica, was built by the Rødsverven shipyard in Sandefjord, Norway. In 1893 it sailed across the Atlantic Ocean to Chicago for the World's Columbian Exposition. There are a considerable number of modern reconstructions of Viking Age ships in service around Northern Europe and North America. The Viking Ship Museum in Roskilde, Denmark, has been particularly prolific in building accurate reconstructions of archaeological finds in its collection.

See also 
 Birlinn
 Galley
 Salme ships

References

External links 

 Recreating a Viking voyage – BBC
 The Viking ship Museum in Roskilde, Denmark
 Web page about the Gokstad ship excavation
 The Oslo Viking Ship Museum
 Gaia, the Gokstad Ship copy
 Munin, a Gokstad replica in Vancouver, BC
 Comparison between Viking and Egyptian Ships
 Dreknor Project, Normandy
 Leif Ericson Viking Ship
 Rebuilding and sailing a Viking Knarr ship
 History of vikings
 Francis Miltoun: Ships & shipping, London, Alexander Moring Ltd., 1903
 The Mariner's Museum: Age of exploration
 New Oseberg Ship Foundation
 Video: Viking ship replica Saga Oseberg tacking
 Video: Viking ship replica Saga Oseberg wearing
 Video: Viking ship replica Saga Oseberg sailing close hauled

 
Boat types
Human-powered watercraft
Sailing ships
Ship types